The High Rock Lake Wilderness is a wilderness area in Nevada containing the northern portion of the Calico Hills. High Rock Lake, for which the wilderness was named, was created about 11,800 years ago after a large rockslide closed the outlet (Box Canyon) to High Rock and Little High Rock Canyons. This new outlet (Fly Canyon) cut a narrow canyon that empties at Soldier Meadows. One special geological feature in Fly Canyon is the potholes. The potholes were carved by whirlpool action of sand and gravel in the stream. Another unique feature is the Fly Slide where emigrants lowered their wagons with ropes into Fly Canyon portion of the Applegate-Lassen Trail.

The wilderness area is managed by the Bureau of Land Management.

See also 
Black Rock Desert-High Rock Canyon Emigrant Trails National Conservation Area

References

External links
High Rock Lake Wilderness page at Wilderness.net

Wilderness areas of Nevada
Protected areas of Humboldt County, Nevada
IUCN Category Ib
Bureau of Land Management areas in Nevada